Moore Road Stone Arch Bridge is a historic stone arch bridge located at Cornwallville in Greene County, New York. It was constructed in 1887, and is a single-span, dry laid limestone structure with a round arch.  Jeremiah Cunningham was the builder.

It was listed on the National Register of Historic Places in 2008.

References

Road bridges on the National Register of Historic Places in New York (state)
Bridges completed in 1887
Bridges in Greene County, New York
National Register of Historic Places in Greene County, New York
Stone arch bridges in the United States